Hymenula is a genus of fungi with unknown classification.

The genus has cosmopolitan distribution.

Species

Species:
 Hymenula aciculosa 
 Hymenula antherici 
 Hymenula anthrisci

References

Fungi